The Jefferson Transit Authority is a public transit agency serving Jefferson County, Washington, United States. It provides fixed route buses, dial-a-ride paratransit, vanpools, and ridesharing.

History

Transit services around Port Townsend began in 1915 with the debut of passenger "jitney" buses operated by private companies. The Stevens Stage Line, successor to the original jitney in Port Townsend, was contracted by the Clallam-Jefferson Community Action Council in 1979 to operate a pilot transit route using funds from the Urban Mass Transportation Administration. A public transportation benefit area was approved by voters in Jefferson County on November 4, 1980, leading to the establishment of Jefferson Transit. The agency began operating routes in May 1981 and bought out the Stevens Stage Line on September 17, 1981.

Jefferson Transit expanded its operations to include connections to Forks on the west side of the Olympic Peninsula in 1995. The system was initially funded by a 0.3 percent sales tax that was increased to 0.6 percent in 2000 and 0.9 percent in 2011 following voter referendums. Following the boarding of a private bus near Port Townsend by U.S. Border Patrol agents, Jefferson Transit allowed the American Civil Liberties Union to post English and Spanish signs in buses with information on civil rights in early 2009.

In June 2015, Jefferson Transit opened their new administrative headquarters on Four Corners Road and a transit center in Port Townsend to replace their existing facilities. The headquarters also includes a public park and ride lot that was expanded in 2018 to add a bicycle parking station.

Routes
Route 1 Brinnon/ Quilcene/ Tri Area - Port Townsend to Brinnon
Route 6 Tri Area Loop - Port Townsend to Tri Area
Route 7 Poulsbo/ Port Ludlow/ Tri Area - Port Townsend to Poulsbo
Route 8 Sequim - Port Townsend to Sequim
Route 11 Downtown Shuttle - Port Townsend Downtown Loop
Route 12 Fort Worden - Port Townsend Loop via Fort Worden
Route 13 Castle Hill - Port Townsend Loop via Castle Hill
Route 14 North Beach - West Port Townsend Loop
West Jefferson Olympic Connection - Forks to Amanda Park (Lake Quinault)

Buses

Jefferson Transit operates eight fixed route buses within Jefferson County. It also operates, in conjunction with Clallam Transit and Grays Harbor Transit, an Olympic Connection service, which goes from Forks to Grays Harbor.

References

External links

Bus transportation in Washington (state)
Transportation in Jefferson County, Washington
Transit agencies in Washington (state)